Hytta is a Norwegian surname. Notable people with the surname include:

Anne Hytta (born 1974), Norwegian Hardingfele musician
Olav Hytta (born 1943), Norwegian businessperson

Norwegian-language surnames